Howard was originally a farming hamlet in the southern part of Cranston, Rhode Island. 

In the mid-19th century, most of the land was acquired by the State of Rhode Island to construct a state prison, a poor house, and other state facilities.  The Rhode Island State Prison, designed by prison reformer John Haviland was first built here in 1878, is a stark and imposing gothic structure built of granite block.  Over the last several decades, numerous other institutional buildings for incarcerated criminals and the intellectually disabled were constructed here. 

Today, Howard encompasses an area of almost one square mile. Its numerous prison buildings house over 2,000 male and female prisoners as well as several hundred mental health patients.

See also
List of prisons in Rhode Island

References
RI Historical Society Howard Prison records

External links
 Rhode Island Department of Corrections

Prisons in Rhode Island
Buildings and structures in Providence County, Rhode Island
Cranston, Rhode Island